Jack Morris (born 1955) is an American former baseball pitcher.

Jack Morris may also refer to:

Sports
 Jack Morris (American football) (1931–2022), American football player
 Jack Morris (footballer) (1878–1947), English footballer
 Jack Morris (jockey) (1845–1896), British jockey

Others
 Jack Morris (Jesuit) (1927–2012), American Jesuit priest
 Jack Morris (phytopathologist), longtime collaborator of Andrew O. Jackson
 John Brande Morris (also known as Jack Morris; 1812–1880), English Anglican theologian, later a Roman Catholic priest
 Jack Morris, character in the 2018 American science fiction action film The Meg

See also
 John Morris (disambiguation)
 Jackie Morris (born 1961), British writer and illustrator